Hizb Waed is an Islamist organization that split off from Hizb ut-Tahrir. It is led by Muhammad Showeiki.

References

Islamism